Hanns-Josef Ortheil (born 5 November 1951, in Cologne) is a German author, scholar of German literature, and pianist.
He has written many autobiographical and historical novels, some of which have been translated into 11 languages, according to WorldCat: French, Dutch, Modern Greek, Spanish, Chinese, Lithuanian, Japanese, Slovenian, and Russian.

Biography
He was born the fifth son in an educated family; his mother, Mary Catherine Ortheil, was a librarian and his father a railroad surveyor and director. As a child, he did not speak, because his mother had temporarily lost her speech, following the loss of four sons during the Second World War. When Ortheil learned to play the piano, this was for him the first time he could express himself and communicate with the world around him. He at first wanted to be a pianist, and studied for a period at the Rome Conservatory.

In Germany he attended the Mainz Rabanus-Maurus-Gymnasium, and then the Universities of Mainz, Göttingen, Paris and Rome. His subjects were musicology, philosophy, Germanic, and comparative literature. During this time, he worked as a film and music journalist for the Mainz Allgemeine Zeitung. In 1976 he wrote his doctoral dissertation on the theory of the novel in the era of the French Revolution at the German Institute of the University of Mainz.

Career
Among his published works is a travel narrative (Die Moselreise) he had already written as a boy of eleven, when his father took him on a tour of the Moselle. Ortheil was a feature writer and literary critic for the Frankfurter Allgemeine Zeitung, TIME, The World, Der Spiegel and the Neue Zürcher Zeitung. He is professor for creative writing and cultural journalism at the University of Hildesheim. In 2006 he was appointed as honorary professor at the University of Heidelberg. Since 2009, he is director of the newly established Institute for Literary Writing and Literary Studies at the Hildesheim Foundation University.

Publications

Non-fiction
Wilhelm Klemm – Ein Lyriker der "Menschheitsdämmerung", Stuttgart 1979
Der poetische Widerstand im Roman, Königstein/Taunus 1980
Mozart im Innern seiner Sprachen, Frankfurt/Main 1982
Jean Paul, Reinbek bei Hamburg 1984
Köder, Beute und Schatten. Suchbewegungen, Essays. Frankfurt/Main 1985 
Schauprozesse. Beiträge zur Kultur der 80er Jahre, Essays, München 1990
Das Glück der Musik – Vom Vergnügen Mozart zu hören, München 2006
Wie Romane entstehen, München 2008, with Klaus Siblewski
Lesehunger. Ein Bücher-Menu in 12 Gängen, München 2009
Was ich liebe – und was nicht, München 2016

Fiction and historical fiction
Schwerenöter, München 1987
Faustinas Küsse, München 1998
Im Licht der Lagune, München 1999
Die Nacht des Don Juan, München 2000
Die Erfindung des Lebens, München 2009

Awards
1979 Aspekte-Literaturpreis
1981 Förderpreis des Landes Nordrhein-Westfalen für Literatur
1982 Sonderpreis der Lektoren beim Ingeborg-Bachmann-Wettbewerb
1988 Literaturpreis der Stadt Stuttgart
1991 Villa Massimo Stipendium
2000 Brandenburgischer Literaturpreis
2000/2001 Mainzer Stadtschreiber
2001 Verdienstmedaille des Landes Baden-Württemberg
2002 Thomas Mann Prize of the City of Lübeck
2004 
2005 Honorary literary citizen of the city of Venice
2006 Koblenzer Literaturpreis
2007 Nicolas Born Prize
2009 
2016 Hannelore Greve Literature Prize

Lectureships in poetics
 WS 1993/1994 Lectureship in poetics at the University of Paderborn
 WS 1994/1995 Lectureship in poetics at Bielefeld University
 WS 1998/1999 Poetics lectureship at the University of Heidelberg
 WS 2005/2006 Poetics lectureship at the University of Zürich
 SS 2007 Professorship in poetry at the University of Bamberg

References

Further reading
 Manfred Durzak; Hartmut Steineck Hanns-Josef Ortheil, im Innern seiner Texte : Studien zu seinem Werk	München : Piper, 1995. 
 Catani; Friedhelm Marx; Julia Schöl Kunst der Erinnerung, Poetik der Liebe : das erzählerische Werk Hanns-Josef Ortheils	Göttingen : Wallstein, 2009  (Proceedings of a conference on Orthell's work held  in summer 2007 at the Otto-Friedrich-Universität Bamberg.)
Helmut Schmitz Der Landvermesser auf der Suche nach der poetischen Heimat. Stuttgart 1997.

External links
 
 
 readings for listening and downloading by Hanns-Josef Ortheil on Lesungen.net
 Hanns-Josef Ortheil in: NRW Literatur im Netz 

1951 births
Living people
Writers from Cologne
People from the Rhine Province
Recipients of the Order of Merit of Baden-Württemberg